Les Quatre-Routes is a railway station in Les Quatre-Routes-du-Lot, Occitanie, France. The station is on the Brive-Toulouse (via Capdenac) railway line. The station is served by TER (local) services operated by SNCF.

Train services
The following services currently call at Les Quatre-Routes:
local service (TER Auvergne-Rhône-Alpes) Brive-la-Gaillarde–Aurillac
local service (TER Occitanie) Brive-la-Gaillarde–Figeac–Rodez

References

Railway stations in Lot (department)